Zoersel is a municipality located in the Belgian province of Antwerp. In 2021, Zoersel had a total population of 22,142. The total area is 38.65 km2.

Sports
The women's A squad of volleyball club Gea Happel Amigos Zoersel plays at the highest level of the Belgian league pyramid.

References

External links
 
  
  Official website

 
Municipalities of Antwerp Province
Populated places in Antwerp Province